Károly Marót (Arad, 2 March 1885 - Budapest, 27 October 1963), was a Hungarian classical scholar, philologist and member of the Hungarian Academy of Sciences.

Marót specialised in the study of ancient epic, particularly the works of Homer, and interpreted the works using the latest ideas in psychiatry about the subconscious.

Selected publications
Der Eid als Tat. Szegred, Szeged Városi Nyomda és Könyvkiadó, 1924.
A Görög irodalom kezdetei. Budapest, Akadémiai Kiadó, 1956.
Die Anfänge der Griechischen Litteratur vorfragen. 1960.

References

External links
SZTE Szegedi Tudományegyetem Klasszika-Filológiai Tanszék: Történet

1885 births
1963 deaths
People from Arad, Romania
20th-century Hungarian historians
Academic staff of the University of Szeged
Members of the Hungarian Academy of Sciences
Hungarian classical scholars